NTWF may refer to:
National Transport Workers' Federation, British association of trade unions 1910-1927
National Traveller Women's Forum, Irish organisation founded 1995